Angaray is a 1954 Bollywood Action film, directed by K. B. Lall, starring Nasir Khan and Nargis in lead roles. The music was composed by S. D. Burman.

Cast
Nasir Khan as Raka
Nargis as Simsi
Pran as Fullura
Jeevan as Howaba
K. N. Singh as Dozila

Music
All songs were music by S. D. Burman and penned by Sahir Ludhianvi.

References

External links
 

1954 films
Films scored by S. D. Burman
1950s Hindi-language films
Indian black-and-white films
Indian drama films
1954 drama films